Berit Kauffeldt (born 8 July 1990) is a former German volleyball player. She was a member of the Germany women's national volleyball team. She has a master's degree in Psychology and a 200 hr Yoga Teacher certificate.

She stopped her career as a volleyball player 2018 and became a sport psychologist in the soccer club of Bayer 04 Leverkusen. In 2020 she founded her own business to lead women and men on their way of becoming whole.

Clubs
  1. VC Parchim (2006–2007)
  Schweriner SC (2007–2012)
  Cuatto Giaveno Volley (2012–2013)
  Imoco Volley (2013–2014)
  Impel Wrocław (2014–2015)
  Lokomotiv Baku (2015–2016)

External links
 
 

1990 births
Living people
German women's volleyball players
People from Parchim
Sportspeople from Mecklenburg-Western Pomerania
21st-century German women
20th-century German women